A list of trade unions active in the Singareni coal fields, in telangana, India. Political affiliation of the union within brackets.

 All India Federation of Trade Unions
 Godavari Loya Boggagani Karmika Sangham, affiliated to Indian Federation of Trade Unions (Communist Party of India (Marxist-Leninist) New Democracy)
 Godavari Loya Boggu Karmika Union, affiliated to Indian Federation of Trade Unions (Communist Party of India (Marxist-Leninist) Pratighatana)
 Singareni Collieries Employees Union, affiliated to Centre of Indian Trade Unions (Communist Party of India (Marxist))
 SCMK Sangh, affiliated to Bharatiya Mazdoor Sangh (Bharatiya Janata Party)
 Singareni Coalmines Labour Union, affiliated to Indian National Trade Union Congress (Indian National Congress)
 Singareni Collieries Labour Union, affiliated to Telugu Nadu Trade Union Council (Telugu Desam Party)
 Singareni Collieries Mine Workers Union
 Singareni Collieries Workers Union, affiliated to All India Trade Union Congress (Communist Party of India)
 Singareni Ghani Karmika Sangham
 Singareni Karmika Samakya (Communist Party of India (Maoist))
 Singareni Workers Union (Unity Centre of Communist Revolutionaries of India (Marxist-Leninist) (D.V. Rao))
 SM&EW Union, affiliated to Hind Mazdoor Sabha
 Telangana Boggu Ghani Karimka Sangham (Telangana Rashtra Samithi)

Results from the 2004 Singareni Collieries Company Limited union polls:
 Singareni Coalmines Labour Union:  30 291 votes
 Singareni Collieries Workers Union: 21 599 votes
 Singareni Collieries Mine Workers Union: 9 807 votes
 Singareni Collieries Labour Union: 7609 votes
 Godavari Loya Boggagani Karmika Sangham: 3179 votes
 SCEU: 2937 votes
 SC&EW Union: 1583 votes
 Others:
 Total: 76 517 votes

The INTUC-affiliated SCMLU won representation with the corporation. The term is four years.

References

See also 
 Indian Trade Unions

Labour movement in India
Trade unions of the Singareni coal fields
Singareni
Trade unions